Ron Smith CBE (15 July 1915 – 20 October 1999) was a British trade unionist.

Born in North London, Smith studied with the Workers' Educational Association, following his father into a job delivering mail, and also becoming active in the Labour Party and the Union of Post Office Workers.  He became a full-time official in 1951, and in 1956 was elected as General Secretary of the union, also being elected to the General Council of the Trades Union Congress.

Smith joined the National Economic Development Council and was a part-time director of the British Overseas Airways Corporation.  He stood down from his trade union post in 1966, to become Director of Labour Relations at the British Steel Corporation, in which role he frequently came into conflict with the steel workers' trade unions.

In his spare time, Smith collected beer mats and wine bottle labels from around the world.

References

1915 births
1999 deaths
Commanders of the Order of the British Empire
General Secretaries of the Union of Communication Workers
Members of the General Council of the Trades Union Congress
British postmen